Half-Century Magazine was published from 1916 to 1925 for an African American audience. It was named for the 50th anniversary of the Emancipation Proclamation. The magazine included fashion advice. Anthony Overton founded the magazine. Despite Overton's role, Katherine E. Williams, who became Katherine Williams-Irvin, was listed as its owner and editor-in-chief. Overton advertised his company's beauty products line in the magazine. It was originally aimed at an audience of both women and men, but shifted its aim to women around 1918.

References

External links
 Digitized copies of Half-Century Magazine at archive.org

African-American magazines
Defunct women's magazines published in the United States
Fashion magazines published in the United States
Magazines established in 1916
Magazines disestablished in 1925